Lamantia is a surname. Notable people with the surname include:

Philip Lamantia (1927–2005), American poet
Paul Lamantia (born 1938), American visual artist
Mirko Lamantia (born 1990), Italian footballer